Said Hassane Said Hachim (11 November 1932 – 30 November 2020) was a Comorian politician. He was Foreign Minister from 1991 until 1993. He replaced Mtara Maecha. In 1996, he contested the presidential elections, eventually losing to Mohamed Taki Abdoulkarim. He died on 30 November 2020 at the age of 88 years and 19 days

References 

1932 births
2020 deaths
Foreign ministers of the Comoros
Government ministers of the Comoros
Candidates for President of the Comoros